Season 4 of Dance Plus premiered on 6 October 2018 on Star Plus and is produced by Urban Brew Studios in association with Frames Productions. The season is hosted by Raghav Juyal and Sugandha Mishra.

Super judge
Remo is the super judge of the season.

Captains
The following are the three captains of the season.
Shakti Mohan 
Punit Pathak
Dharmesh Yelande

Format
The fourth round is the international squad challenge in which one member of each team has to match the level of dancing of the international dancer. The artist which matches the score gets double the points of the international squad. This round is also scored out of ten by the super judge.

Based on the scores of these rounds, two teams go to the final showdown. The fourth artist from each team performs and the super judge chooses the winner. The winning team's captain nominates two artists from his or her team to go forward and the super judge chooses the artist who will go to top eight.

Top 12

Only exception to Top 12 is S-Unity Crew of "Team Raghav Juyal".

Top 10
Now, after the super judge, Remo D'Souza, has accepted S-Unity Crew as a qualified contestant, they are taking part in the competition as a part of Team Dharmesh.

Finalists (top 4) 
Vartika Jha and V Unbeatable became the first two finalists. While Sujan-Aaanchel and Chetan Salunkhe joined them later based on their performance and voting by viewers.

Double plus 

 1. Vartika Jha (Team Dharmesh)
 2. Rishabh Sharma (Team Shakti)
 3. B-Unique Crew (Team Shakti)
 4. Feel Crew (Team Punit)
 5. Chetan Salunkhe (Team Punit)
 6. V Unbeatable (Team Dharmesh)
 7. Sujan & Aaanchel (Team Punit)
 8. S Unity Crew (Team Dharmesh)
 9. Gang 13 (Team Dharmesh)

International squad round 

 Royal Family Dance Crew
 Poppin John
 Karen and Ricardo
 Shovana Narayan
 Jaja and B-Dash
 Marquese Scott

Winners of weekly final showdowns 

 1. Rishabh Sharma (Team Shakti)
 2. Sujan & Anchal (Team Punit)
 3. V Unbeatable (Team Dharmesh)
 4. D Core (Team Dharmesh)
 5. Vartika Jha (Team Dharmesh)
 6. B-Unique (Team Shakti)
7 dharmesh

Special guests

References

External links 

 Dance Plus (season 4) on Hotstar

2018 Indian television seasons